10th Division or 10th Infantry Division may refer to:

In infantry divisions
 10th Division (Australia)
 10th Infantry Division (Bangladesh)
 10th Infantry Division (Belgium)
 10th Division (People's Republic of China)
 10th Parachute Division (France)
 10th Bavarian Infantry Division (German Empire) – World War I
 10th Division (German Empire)
 10th Ersatz Division (German Empire)
 10th Reserve Division (German Empire)
 10th Infantry Division (Greece)
 10th Indian Infantry Division
 10th Division (Imperial Japanese Army)
 10th Division (Japan)
 10th Division (North Korea)
 10th Infantry (AGILA) Division (Philippines)
 10th Infantry Division (Poland)
 10th Infantry Division (Russian Empire)
 10th Rifle Division (Soviet Union)
 10th Indian Division – British Indian Army (United Kingdom) during World War I
 10th (Irish) Division (United Kingdom)
 10th Division, U.S. Army formation created during World War I; see Division insignia of the United States Army
 10th Mountain Division (United States)
 31st Infantry Division (United States), formerly the 10th Division, a U.S. National Guard division established in early 1917 consisting of Alabama, Florida, and Georgia
 10th Division (Vietnam)

In cavalry or motorized divisions
 10th Cavalry Division (Russian Empire)
 10th Motorised Division Piave (Kingdom of Italy)

In armoured divisions
 10th Panzer Division (Wehrmacht) (Germany)
 10th Panzer Division (Bundeswehr) (Germany)
 10th SS Panzer Division Frundsberg (Germany)
 10th Division (Iraq)
 10th Guards Uralsko-Lvovskaya Tank Division (Soviet Union)
 10th Armoured Division (United Kingdom)
 10th Armored Division (United States)

In aviation divisions
 10th Air Division (United States)
 10th Air Division (People's Republic of China)

See also
 Tenth Army (disambiguation)
 X Corps (disambiguation)
 10th Brigade (disambiguation)
 10th Regiment (disambiguation)
 10th Group (disambiguation)
 10th Battalion (disambiguation)
 10 Squadron (disambiguation)